Konaru (also Romanized as Konārū and Konowru; also known as Kanarun and Konāreh) is a village in Tazian Rural District, in the Central District of Bandar Abbas County, Hormozgan Province, Iran. At the 2006 census, its population was 1,336, in 292 families.

References 

Populated places in Bandar Abbas County